Placidochromis longimanus is a species of cichlid native to the southern portion of Lake Malawi, Lake Malombe and the Shire River. This species can reach a length of  TL. It is also important to local commercial fisheries as well as being found in the aquarium trade. It is the type species of the genus Placidochromis.

References

longimanus
Taxa named by Ethelwynn Trewavas
Fish described in 1935
Taxonomy articles created by Polbot